Omorgus capillamentis is a species of hide beetle in the subfamily Omorginae.

References

capillamentis
Beetles described in 2011